Paper Moon is an American situation comedy which aired for one season on ABC in 1974. The series starred Christopher Connelly and Jodie Foster.

Premise

Moses "Moze" Pray is a confidence man and traveling Bible salesman who roams the Midwestern United States in his 1931 Ford Model A roadster during the Great Depression of the 1930s, flim-flamming people with his gold-embossed Bibles. Tagging along with him is Adelaide "Addie" Loggins, a precocious 11-year-old girl who is convinced that Moze is her father – although he denies it – and calls herself "Addie Pray." Usually only a step ahead of the law, they always are working one fast-buck scheme or another, although they never have much money. They get on one another's nerves but have a strong bond, and it often is up to Addie to bail Moze out.

Cast
 Christopher Connelly as Moses "Moze" Pray
 Jodie Foster as Adelaide "Addie" Loggins ("Addie Pray")

Production

A gentle comedy, Paper Moon was based on the successful 1973 movie of the same name, which in turn was based on Addie Pray, a 1971 novel by Joe David Brown which was retitled Paper Moon after the release of the movie.  The series was filmed on location in Kansas. For its theme song, it used an authentic 1933 recording of "It's Only a Paper Moon," composed by Harold Arlen with lyrics by Yip Harburg and Billy Rose.

The Directors Company and Paramount Television produced Paper Moon. Anthony Wilson was the television show's executive producer and Robert Stambler produced it. Episode directors included James Frawley, Herschel Daugherty, Alex March, Jerry Paris, and Jack Shea.

Broadcast history

Paper Moon premiered in the United States on September 12, 1974, on ABC. It suffered from low ratings and ran for only 13 episodes, the last of which aired on December 19, 1974. Reruns of the show then were broadcast in its regular time slot until January 2, 1975. It aired at 8:30 p.m. on Thursday throughout its run.

In the United Kingdom, Paper Moon premiered on September 24, 1974. It aired on BBC2 on Tuesdays at 9:00 pm.

Episodes
SOURCESultimate70s.com Episode Guide for 'Paper Moon'"Thursday TV & Radio Schedule," Schenectady Gazette, September 12, 1974, p. 36.New York Daily News, October 3, 1974, p. 297."Thursday TV & Radio Schedule," Schenectady Gazette, October 31, 1974, p. 43."Thursday TV & Radio Schedule," Schenectady Gazette, November 28, 1974, p. E10.

OTHER GUEST STARS in Paper Moon episodes were Nellie Bellflower, Lucille Benson, Lynn Carlin, Jeff Donnell, Ronnie Claire Edwards, Bert Freed, Burton Gilliam, Dabbs Greer, Jacques Hampton, Rick Hurst, Kay E. Kuter, Jon Lormer, Strother Martin, Vern Porter, Peggy Rea, and Anthony Zerbe.

References

Citations

Bibliography
Brooks, Tim & Marsh, Earle (1995). The Complete Directory to Prime Time Network TV Shows: 1946–Present. Ballantine Books. .
McNeil, Alex (1996). Total Television. Penguin Books USA, Inc. .

External links
 Paper Moon opening credits on YouTube
 Television promo for Paper Moon on YouTube
 Paper Moon episode "Settling" on YouTube

American Broadcasting Company original programming
1970s American sitcoms
1974 American television series debuts
1975 American television series endings
English-language television shows
Television shows set in Kansas
Television series by CBS Studios